Muntirayuq (Quechua muntira an ancient cloth cap; a bullfighter's hat, -yuq a suffix, 'the one with a cap', also spelled Monterrayoc) is a mountain in the Andes of Peru which reaches a height of approximately . It is located in the Junín Region, Jauja Province, Apata District.

References 

Mountains of Peru
Mountains of Junín Region